The Elizabethtown–Fort Knox Metropolitan Statistical Area, as defined by the United States Census Bureau, is an area consisting of two counties in Kentucky, anchored by the city of Elizabethtown and the nearby Fort Knox Army post. As of the 2020 census, the MSA had a population of 155,572. 

The Elizabethtown–Fort Knox Metropolitan Statistical Area is part of the Louisville–Elizabethtown–Madison, KY–IN Combined Statistical Area, which covers a 17-county area (eleven in Kentucky and six in Indiana).

The Census Bureau officially changed the name of the metropolitan area from "Elizabethtown" to "Elizabethtown–Fort Knox" in 2013.

Counties
Hardin
LaRue

Communities

Incorporated places
Elizabethtown (Principal city)
Hodgenville
Muldraugh (partial)
Radcliff
Sonora
Upton 
Vine Grove
West Point

Census-designated places
Note: census-designated places are unincorporated.
Fort Knox (principal city)

Unincorporated places
Athertonville
Buffalo
Cecilia
Eastview
Glendale
Lyons
Magnolia
Mt. Sherman
Rineyville
Stephensburg
Tonieville

Demographics
As of the census of 2000, there were 107,547 people, 39,772 households, and 29,221 families residing within the MSA. This adds to over 100%. The racial makeup of the MSA was 83.57% White, 15.32% African American, 0.39% Native American, 1.59% Asian, 0.20% Pacific Islander, 1.22% from other races, and 2.20% from two or more races.  Hispanic or Latino of any race were 3.07% of the population.

The median income for a household in the MSA was $34,900, and the median income for a family was $40,698. Males had a median income of $30,825 versus $21,390 for females. The per capita income for the MSA was $16,676.

See also
Kentucky census statistical areas

References